The 1948 Campeonato Nacional de Fútbol Profesional was Chilean first tier’s 16th season. Audax Italiano were the champions, winning their third league title.

Scores

Standings

Topscorer

Relegation

References

External links 
ANFP 
RSSSF Chile 1948

Primera División de Chile seasons
Primera
Chile